The Environmental Protection Act 1990 (initialism: EPA) is an Act of the Parliament of the United Kingdom that  defines, within England and Wales and Scotland, the fundamental structure and authority for waste management and control of emissions into the environment.

Overview 
Part 1: establishes a general regime by which the Secretary of State,  the Secretary of State for Environment, Food and Rural Affairs, can prescribe any process or substance and set limits on it respective of its emissions into the environment. Authorisation and enforcement was originally in the hands of HM Inspectorate of Pollution and local authorities but in 1996 became the responsibility of the Environment Agency (EA) and Scottish Environment Protection Agency (SEPA). Operation of a prescribed process is prohibited without approval and there are criminal sanctions against offenders.

Part 2: sets out a regime for regulation|regulating and licensing the acceptable disposal of controlled waste on land.

Controlled waste is any household, industrial and commercial waste. Unauthorised or harmful depositing, treatment or disposal of controlled waste is prohibited with prohibition enforced by criminal sanctions. Further, there is a broad duty of care on importers, producers, carriers, keepers, treaters or disposers of controlled waste to prevent unauthorised or harmful activities. Breach of the duty of care is a crime.

The Act demands that the Secretary of State creates a National Waste Strategy for England and Wales, and that SEPA creates a strategy for Scotland. Local authorities have duties to collect controlled waste and to undertake recycling.

There are criminal penalties on households and businesses who fail to co-operate with the local authorities' arrangements. Enforcement of these penalties sometimes proves controversial.

Part 2a: was inserted by the Environment Act 1995 and defines a scheme of identification and compulsory remedial action for contaminated land.

Part 3: defines a class of statutory nuisances over which the local authority can demand remedial action supported by criminal penalties.

Part 4: defines a set of criminal offences concerning litter.

Part 5: defines a regime of statutory notification and risk assessment for genetically modified organisms (GMOs). There are duties with respect to the import, acquisition, keeping, release or marketing of GMOs and the Secretary of State has the power to prohibit specific GMOs if there is a danger of environmental damage.

Part 6: of the Act created three new organisations: the Nature Conservancy Council for England, the Nature Conservancy Council for Scotland, and the Countryside Council for Wales. Since 1990, the English and Scottish councils have been the subject of considerable reorganisation and, as of 2008, only the Welsh council is still governed by the Act.

The Act superseded the requirements under section 1(1)(d) of the Health and Safety at Work etc. Act 1974 in respect of controlling noxious emissions.

In the operating year 2005/ 2006, the  brought 880 prosecutions with an average fine of about £1,700, and 736 in 2006/2007 with an average fine of £6,773. There have also been sentences of imprisonment, including two of over sixteen months in 2006/ 2007.

Background
The Act implements the European Union Waste Framework Directive in England and Wales and Scotland.

The Act was intended to strengthen pollution controls and support enforcement with heavier penalties. Before the Act there had been separate environmental regulation of air, water and land pollution and the Act brought in an integrated scheme that would seek the "best practicable environmental option". There was previously no uniform system of licensing or public right of access to information. The split of the Nature Conservancy Council (NCC) into English, Welsh and Scottish bodies was controversial. Purportedly forced on Secretary of State Chris Patten by Secretary of State for Scotland Malcolm Rifkind and forestry minister Lord Sanderson, some saw it as "punishment" for the vigorous opposition the NCC had mounted to afforestation in the Flow Country.

Part I - Prescribed processes and substances
The Secretary of State has the power to prescribe specific processes and substances by statutory instrument. The power was exercised by the Environmental Protection (Prescribed Processes and Substances) Regulations 1991 which have been amended several times. Further, the Secretary of State can make regulations to fix emission standards on prescribed processes and substances.

Once a process is prescribed, it can only be operated on authorisation from the enforcing authority. Applications must be made to the authority and the authority can refuse authorisation or give it subject to conditions. The authorisation is transferable to somebody else who takes over the undertaking provided that the enforcing authority is notified. The enforcing authority can revoke the authorisation or vary its conditions and the operator can apply to have the conditions varied.

The 1991 regulations were revoked for England and Wales by the Environmental Permitting (England and Wales) Regulations 2007. Permitting is now regulated by the Environmental Permitting (England and Wales) Regulations 2010. The 1991 regulations remain in force in Scotland, although they are in practice superseded by the Pollution Prevention and Control (Scotland) Regulations 2000 and 2012 made under the Pollution Prevention and Control Act 1999.

Enforcement
Such an enforcing authority can issue an enforcement notice or prohibition notice on a noncompliant operator and there are criminal penalties including fines and imprisonment for violations.

An operator may appeal a decision about the issue of authorisation, conditions, enforcement or prohibition to the Secretary of State who may hold a hearing or public inquiry.

Enforcing authorities must provide public information on applications, authorisations and enforcement so long as confidentiality and national security are protected.

Part II - Disposal of controlled waste on land

Controlled waste
Waste is defined as any substance or object within very broad categories set out in Schedule 2B "which the holder discards or intends or is required to discard". Controlled waste is "household, industrial and commercial waste or any such waste". The exact definition covers a very broad range of waste.

The meaning of discard was considered by the European Court of Justice in 2002, where it was held:

Unauthorised or harmful deposit, treatment or disposal of controlled waste
No person may "treat, keep or dispose of controlled waste in a manner likely to cause pollution of the environment or harm to human health".

Except in the case of domestic household waste treated or kept or disposed of on the premises, no person may:
Deposit controlled waste, or knowingly cause or knowingly permit controlled waste to be deposited in or on any land unless a waste management licence authorising the deposit is in force and the deposit is in accordance with the licence; or
Treat, keep or dispose of controlled waste, or knowingly cause or knowingly permit controlled waste to be treated, kept or disposed of:
In or on any land; or
By means of any mobile plant;
— except under and in accordance with a waste management licence.

Duty of care in respect of waste
Section 34(1) imposes a duty on "any person who imports, produces, carries, keeps, treats or disposes of controlled waste or, as a broker, has control of such waste, to take all such measures applicable to him in that capacity as are reasonable in the circumstances":
To prevent any contravention by any other person of section 33;
To prevent any contravention of certain (i.e. specific) provisions of the Pollution Prevention and Control Regulations;
To prevent the escape of the waste from his control or that of any other person; and
On the transfer of the waste, to secure:
That the transfer is only to an authorised person or to a person for authorised transport purposes; and
That there is transferred such a written description of the waste as will enable other persons to avoid a contravention section 33 or the Pollution Prevention and Control Regulations.

Under section 34(2) an occupier of domestic property must, as respects the household waste produced on the property, take reasonable steps to secure that any transfer of waste is only to an authorised person or to a person for authorised transport purposes but has none of the other section 34(1) duties.

Authorised persons include local authorities who have responsibility for waste collection, persons licensed to manage or registered to transport waste or otherwise exempt persons.

Section 34(5) allows the Secretary of State to make regulations as to retention of documents and the Environmental Protection (Duty of Care) Regulations 1991 stipulate that:
All transfers of controlled waste must be accompanied by a transfer note;
Copies of all transfer notes must be kept for two years; and
Transfer notes must be available to the enforcement authority.

Waste management licences
Licences are issued by waste management authorities and may be subject to conditions. The Secretary of State may make regulations about what is to be included in the licence as a condition. Licences are transferable and decisions as to refusal to grant a licence or as to conditions can be appealed to the Secretary of State.·

National and local government responsibilities
Sections 44A and 44B were added by the Environment Act 1995 and require the development of national waste strategies for England and Wales, and Scotland respectively.

Section 45 requires waste collection authorities, usually local authorities, to collect household waste unless it is in an isolated location or arrangements can reasonably be expected to be made by the person who controls the waste. They may also collect commercial waste if requested to do so, but are not obliged to provide this service. Industrial waste can only be collected with the consent of the waste disposal authority. No charge is to be made for collecting household waste, unless the Secretary of State makes regulations specifying certain (i.e. specific) collections that must be paid for. A reasonable charge is to be made for commercial waste collection (s.45(4)). Waste collection authorities have responsibilities for emptying privies and cesspools and have the power to lay pipes, sewers and other infrastructure to collect waste. Waste collected by a waste collection authority is the property of the authority.

The authority can give a householder notice that waste must be disposed of in a specified receptacle, and in a specified manner. It is a crime to fail, without reasonable excuse, to observe such requirements. On summary conviction in a magistrates' court, an offender can be fined up to level 3 on the standard scale.
 
Authorities also have powers over receptacles for commercial and industrial waste. There is a system of fixed penalty notices for offences under these sections. Where controlled waste is deposited on land within their responsibilities, authorities may give notice to the occupier to remove it. It is a crime to disturb or sort over, unless with consent, waste deposited for collection by the waste collection authority. On summary conviction in a magistrates' court, an offender can be fined up to level 5 on the standard scale.

Waste collection authorities must deliver the waste to waste disposal authorities unless they intend to recycle it themselves. Waste disposal authorities must dispose of the waste and also provide facilities for householders to deposit their own waste.

From 31 December 2010, waste collection authorities in England must make arrangements for the separate collection of at least two types of recyclable waste unless it would be unreasonably costly to do so. The Welsh National Assembly has the power to extend this to Wales. Section 55 gives waste disposal authorities and waste collection authorities powers to recycle waste.

A disposal authority may:
Make arrangements to recycle waste;
Make arrangements to use waste to produce heat or electricity;
Buy or otherwise acquire waste with a view to its being recycled;
Use, sell or otherwise dispose of waste, or anything produced from such waste.

A waste collection authority may:
 Buy or otherwise acquire waste with a view to recycling it;
 Use, or dispose of by way of sale or otherwise to another person, waste belonging to the authority or anything produced from such waste.

Enforcement
Breach of sections 33 and 34 is a crime and penalties for serious offences by businesses can extend to unlimited fines, imprisonment, seizure of vehicles and clean-up costs.

Part IIA - Contaminated land
Contaminated land is "any land which appears to the local authority in whose area it is situated to be in such a condition, by reason of substances in, on or under the land, that":
"Significant harm is being caused or there is a significant possibility of such harm being caused; or
Significant pollution of the water environment is being caused or there is a significant possibility of such pollution being caused."

The Act does not apply to contamination from radioactivity (s.78YC) but similar provisions have been made under subsequent regulations.

The authority, EA or SEPA must then serve a remediation notice on the appropriate person.

The appropriate person responsible for remedial work is "any person, or any of the persons, who caused or knowingly permitted the substances" giving rise to the designation "to be in, on or under that land". If no such person can be identified after reasonable enquiries, the present owner or occupier is the appropriate person. Any persons controlling other land to which access is required for remediation must grant such access and may apply to the appropriate person for compensation. The appropriate person is deemed to be responsible for remediation of other land into which substances have escaped.

The appropriate person may appeal a notice within 21 days to:
A magistrates' court, or a sheriff court in Scotland, where the notice was served by the local authority; or
The Secretary of State, where the notice was served by the EA or SEPA.
There is a further right of appeal from the magistrates' court to the High Court. but ultimately it is a crime not to comply with a notice. The local authority, EA or SEPA can perform the remedial work themselves if the appropriate person cannot be found, defaults or requests that they do so. The authority have discretion as to whether to make the appropriate person responsible for the costs.

Local authorities, the EA and SEPA must maintain a register of notices that is publicly available, save for reasons of confidentiality and national security.

Part III - Statutory nuisances
Section 79 defines several statutory nuisances:
Any premises in such a state as to be prejudicial to health or a nuisance;
Smoke emitted from premises so as to be prejudicial to health or a nuisance;
Fumes or gases emitted from premises so as to be prejudicial to health or a nuisance;
Any dust, steam, smell or other effluvia arising on industrial, trade or business premises and being prejudicial to health or a nuisance;
Any accumulation or deposit which is prejudicial to health or a nuisance;
Any animal kept in such a place or manner as to be prejudicial to health or a nuisance;
Noise emitted from premises so as to be prejudicial to health or a nuisance; and
Noise that is prejudicial to health or a nuisance and is emitted from or caused by a vehicle, machinery or equipment on a highway, road, footway, square or court open to the public.

Some exclusions from these categories exist including contaminated land, activities of the armed forces, some categories of smoke and dark smoke, traffic and demonstrations.

Local authorities have a duty to make periodic inspections of their area or in response to a complaint from the public. The local authority shall serve an offending occupier with an abatement notice to cease the nuisance. The occupier can appeal the notice, within 21 days, to a magistrates' court, in England and Wales, or a sheriff court in Scotland. Otherwise, it is a crime to fail, without reasonable excuse, to comply with the notice, punishable on summary conviction by a fine at level 5 of the standard scale, rising by ten percent for every further day on which the nuisance continues. If the offence is committed by the occupier of business premises, the maximum fine is £40,000. Where the notice is not complied with, the local authority may take reasonable action to abate the nuisance and recover the expenses from the occupier, if necessary by installments or by making a charge on the property.

Any person aggrieved by a statutory nuisance may make a complaint to the magistrates or sheriff. The court can order the occupier to abate the damage and, in England and Wales only, impose a fine of up to level 5 on the standard scale. It is a crime, without reasonable excuse, to disobey such an order, punishable on summary conviction by a fine at level 5 of the standard scale, rising by ten percent for every further day on which the nuisance continues. Sch.3, s.2 provides a power to a magistrates' court to grant a warrant of entry to a local authority for ascertaining whether there exists a statutory nuisance, and taking any action or executing any work to abate it.

Section 84 repeals local authority controls over offensive trades under the Public Health Act 1936.

Part IV - Litter
Section 87 creates the criminal offence of leaving litter.

There are exceptions where the person has lawful authorisation or consent. Offenders can, on summary conviction in a magistrates' court, be sentenced to a fine of up to level 4 on the standard scale.

There is also a system of fixed penalty notices. Local authorities and central government have duties to keep roads, highways and public spaces free from litter. Members of the public who are aggrieved by litter in public places can apply to a magistrates' court for an abatement notice to order the responsible public body to carry out its duties under section 89. Public authorities also have powers to issue litter abatement notices and litter clearing notices on the occupiers of certain (i.e. specific) premises to order clearing of litter. Occupiers can appeal against a notice to the magistrates' court within 21 days but it is otherwise a crime to disobey a notice, punishable on summary conviction to a fine of up to level 4 on the standard scale. A local authority may also issue street litter control notices to occupiers of certain (i.e. specific) premises, such as take away food establishments, to keep the street and public areas near to their premises clear of litter.

Local authorities have the power to designate land in order to prevent the distribution of free printed material, such as advertising flyers. Offenders face summary conviction in a magistrates' court and a fine of up to level 4 on the standard scale, seizure of the material or a fixed penalty notice Local authorities may seize abandoned shopping trolleys and luggage trolleys, returning them to their owner and imposing a statutory fee, or otherwise disposing of them.

Some of the provisions of this part were repealed and superseded by the Clean Neighbourhoods and Environment Act 2005.

Part V - Amendment of the Radioactive Substances Act 1960
Part V made a number of amendments to the Radioactive Substances Act 1960, including in relation to the appointment of inspectors and assistant inspectors, fees in respect of registrations, enforcement powers and application of the Act to Crown and United Kingdom Atomic Energy Authority premises.

It was repealed by the Radioactive Substances Act 1993, which consolidated the 1960 Act.

Part VI - Genetically modified organisms

Part VI contains provision intended to ensure that "all appropriate measures are taken to avoid damage to the environment which may arise from the escape or release from human control of genetically modified organisms". These include limitations on the import, acquisition, keeping, release or marketing of GMOs.

See also
Environment Agency v Clark

References
Within the Environmental Protection Act

Bibliography

External links

Environmental law in the United Kingdom
Genetic engineering in the United Kingdom
United Kingdom Acts of Parliament 1990
1990 in the environment